Astragalus oxyphysus is a species of milkvetch known by the common name Diablo milkvetch. It is endemic to central California, where it grows in dry grassland and scrub habitat in the Central Valley and the adjacent Inner Coast Ranges and Sierra Nevada foothills.

Description
Astragalus oxyphysus is a robust perennial herb forming clumps of erect, leafy stems up to 80 centimeters tall. Leaves are up to 17 centimeters long and are made up of many lance-shaped leaflets. The plant flowers in large inflorescences of up to 65 flowers each.

The individual flower is cream-colored and at least 2 centimeters long. The fruit is a hanging legume pod up to 4 centimeters long. It is inflated but narrow and dries to a thin, almost transparent papery texture.

References

External links
Jepson Manual Treatment - Astragalus oxyphysus
USDA Plants Profile
Astragalus oxyphysus - Photo gallery

oxyphysus
Endemic flora of California
Flora of the Sierra Nevada (United States)
Natural history of the Central Valley (California)
Flora without expected TNC conservation status